In mathematics, algebraic L-theory is the K-theory of quadratic forms; the term was coined by C. T. C. Wall, 
with L being used as the letter after K. Algebraic L-theory, also known as "Hermitian K-theory",
is important in surgery theory.

Definition
One can define L-groups for any ring with involution R: the quadratic L-groups  (Wall) and the symmetric L-groups  (Mishchenko, Ranicki).

Even dimension 
More precisely, 

 

is the abelian group of equivalence classes  of non-degenerate ε-quadratic forms  over R, where the underlying R-modules F are finitely generated free. The equivalence relation is given by stabilization with respect to hyperbolic ε-quadratic forms: 

.

Odd dimension 
Defining odd-dimensional L-groups is more complicated; further details and the definition of the odd-dimensional L-groups can be found in the references mentioned below.

Examples and applications
The L-groups of a group  are the L-groups  of the group ring . In the applications to topology   is the fundamental group
 of a space . The quadratic L-groups 
play a central role in the surgery classification of the homotopy types of -dimensional manifolds of dimension , and in the formulation of the Novikov conjecture.

The distinction between symmetric L-groups and quadratic L-groups, indicated by upper and lower indices, reflects the usage in group homology and cohomology.

The quadratic L-groups:  and the symmetric L-groups:  are related by 
a symmetrization map  which is an isomorphism modulo 2-torsion, and which corresponds to the polarization identities.

The quadratic and the symmetric L-groups are 4-fold periodic (the comment of Ranicki, page 12, on the non-periodicity of the symmetric L-groups refers to another type of L-groups, defined using "short complexes").

In view of the applications to the classification of manifolds there are extensive calculations of
the quadratic -groups . For finite 
algebraic methods are used, and mostly geometric methods (e.g. controlled topology) are used for infinite . 

More generally, one can define L-groups for any additive category with a chain duality, as in Ranicki (section 1).

Integers 
The simply connected L-groups are also the L-groups of the integers, as
 for both  =  or  For quadratic L-groups, these are the surgery obstructions to simply connected surgery.

The quadratic L-groups of the integers are:

In doubly even dimension (4k), the quadratic L-groups detect the signature; in singly even dimension (4k+2), the L-groups detect the Arf invariant (topologically the Kervaire invariant).

The symmetric L-groups of the integers are:

In doubly even dimension (4k), the symmetric L-groups, as with the quadratic L-groups, detect the signature; in dimension (4k+1), the L-groups detect the de Rham invariant.

References

Geometric topology
Algebraic topology
Quadratic forms
Surgery theory